Wüllnerstraße is a Cologne Stadtbahn station served by lines 7 and 13. Like the section from Barbarossaplatz to Ubierring the station is one where both high- and low-floor vehicles stop on the same platform.

This station is located on Stadtwaldgürtel in Köln-Braunsfeld.

See also 
 List of Cologne KVB stations

External links 
 station info page 

Cologne-Bonn Stadtbahn stations
Cologne KVB stations
Lindenthal, Cologne